For the rural municipality, see Manambolo (disambiguation)

The Manambolo River is a river in the highlands of western Madagascar of  370 km.
It crosses the Tsingy de Bemaraha Strict Nature Reserve and the Maningoza Reserve.

The unpaved Route nationale 8 (Madagascar) crosses this river by ferry.

This river flies thru Bekopaka, Ambakaka, Ankaramena, Ankavandra and Soaloka.

References

Rivers of Madagascar
Rivers of Melaky
Rivers of Bongolava